Probable E3 ubiquitin-protein ligase HERC5 is an enzyme that in humans is encoded by the HERC5 gene.

This gene is a member of the HERC family of ubiquitin ligases and encodes a protein with a HECT domain and five RCC1 repeats. Pro-inflammatory cytokines upregulate expression of this gene in endothelial cells. The protein localizes to the cytoplasm and perinuclear region and functions as an interferon-induced E3 protein ligase that mediates ISGylation of protein targets. The gene lies in a cluster of HERC family genes on chromosome 4. HERC5 has been shown to exhibit antiviral activity towards HIV-1, influenza A virus and human papillomavirus.

Interactions
HERC5 has been shown to interact with NME2 and Cyclin E1.

References